Since Kansas became a U.S. state in 1861, it has sent congressional delegations to the United States Senate and United States House of Representatives. Each state elects two senators to serve for six years, and members of the House to two-year terms. Before becoming a state, the Kansas Territory elected a non-voting delegate at-large to Congress from 1854 to 1861.

These are tables of congressional delegations from Kansas to the United States Senate and the United States House of Representatives.

Current delegation 

Kansas's current congressional delegation in the  consists of its two senators, both of whom are Republicans, and its four representatives: three Republicans and one Democrat.

The current dean of the Kansas delegation is Senator Jerry Moran, having served in the Senate since 2011 and in Congress since 1997.

United States Senate

United States House of Representatives

1854–1861: 1 non-voting delegate 
Starting on December 20, 1854, Kansas Territory sent a non-voting delegate to the House.

1859–1873: 1 at-large seat 
Following statehood on January 29, 1961, Kansas had one seat in the House.

1873–1883: 3 seats 
Following the 1870 census, Kansas was apportioned 3 seats, all of which were elected at-large statewide until 1875, when it redistricted into 3 districts.

1883–1893: 7 seats 
Following the 1880 census, Kansas was apportioned 7 seats. Until 1885, 3 seats were elected from single member districts and 4 were elected at-large statewide on a general ticket. In 1885, all 7 seats were redistricted.

1893–1933: 8 seats 
Following the 1890 census, Kansas was apportioned 8 seats. Until 1907, 7 seats were elected from single member districts and 1 was elected at-large statewide. In 1907, all 8 seats were redistricted.

1933–1943: 7 seats 
Following the 1930 census, Kansas was apportioned 7 seats, all of which were elected from single member districts.

1943–1963: 6 seats 
Following the 1940 census, Kansas was apportioned 6 seats, all of which were elected from single member districts.

1963–1993: 5 seats 
Following the 1960 census, Kansas was apportioned 5 seats, all of which were elected from single member districts.

1993–present: 4 seats 
Following the 1990 census, Kansas was apportioned 4 seats, all of which were elected from single member districts.

Key

See also 

List of United States congressional districts
Kansas's congressional districts
Political party strength in Kansas

References 

Politics of Kansas
Kansas
Congressional delegations